Garda Operational Support (formally Special Services) is a section of the Garda Síochána responsible for providing support services to policing in Ireland. Operational Support is operationally under the authority of Garda National Support Services branch and is headed by a Superintendent.

Overview 
Operational Support, which provides specialist support to Gardaí nationwide, is divided into four units. They are:

 Air Support Unit
 Dog Support Unit
 Mounted Support Unit
 Water Support Unit

External links 
Official Website

Operational Support